Eulepidotis scita is a moth of the family Erebidae first described by Francis Walker in 1869. It is found in the Neotropics.

References

Moths described in 1869
scita